Dávid Haščák (born 28 October 1998) is a Slovak football midfielder for Partizán Bardejov.

Club career

1. FC Tatran Prešov
Haščák made his professional Slovak Super Liga debut for 1. FC Tatran Prešov against Slovan Bratislava on 19 February 2017.

LZS Starowice Dolne
In summer 2020, Haščák signed a deal with Polish IV liga club LZS Starowice Dolne. He helped his team to secure a second place after the autumn round, scoring 15 goals in 23 games.

Stal Stalowa Wola
On 9 February 2021, he joined Polish III liga side Stal Stalowa Wola for the 2020-21 summer round season. He made his debut on 27 March as a substitute against Wólczanka Wólka Pełkińska. He scored his first goal in the last game of the season, on 20 June 2021 in a 2–2 draw against Podhale Nowy Targ. Separately from the first club, he also played for their IV liga reserves. His contract with Stal was terminated in August 2021.

References

External links
 
 Dávid Haščák at Futbalnet (in Slovak) 
 
 

1998 births
Living people
People from Stará Ľubovňa
Sportspeople from the Prešov Region
Slovak footballers
Association football midfielders
1. FC Tatran Prešov players
FK Železiarne Podbrezová players
ŠK Odeva Lipany players
Partizán Bardejov players
Stal Stalowa Wola players
Slovak Super Liga players
Expatriate footballers in Poland
2. Liga (Slovakia) players
III liga players
IV liga players